J.T. Thomas III (born August 15, 1988) is a former American football linebacker. He was drafted by the Chicago Bears in the sixth round of the 2011 NFL Draft. He played college football at West Virginia.

Professional career

Chicago Bears
On July 27, 2011, the Bears signed Thomas to a 4-year contract. Thomas was eventually placed on injured reserve due to a hip problem. In the 2012 season opener against the Indianapolis Colts, Thomas forced LaVon Brazill to fumble, and Kelvin Hayden recovered the loose ball.

On August 31, 2013, Thomas was among the final cuts by the Bears.

Jacksonville Jaguars
Thomas was claimed off waivers by the Jacksonville Jaguars on September 1, 2013.

New York Giants
On March 10, 2015, Thomas signed a three-year, $12 million contract with the New York Giants. On December 31, 2015, Thomas was placed on injured reserve.

On September 12, 2016, Thomas was placed on injured reserve after he suffered torn ligaments in his left knee in Week 1 against the Dallas Cowboys.

On September 28, 2017, Thomas was once again placed on injured reserve after suffering a groin injury in Week 2. He was released with an injury settlement on November 28, 2017.

Personal life
Thomas has a brother named Jared who has autism.  Thomas is a member of Omega Psi Phi fraternity and was initiated through the Nu Zeta chapter at WVU. Thomas attended Blanche Ely High School, where he was teammates with Patrick Peterson.

He gained some national media attention for taking a disabled eighth grade girl in Morgantown, West Virginia to her 8th grade dance on Friday, May 20, 2011. He received more national attention after he gave a 14-year-old boy with epilepsy tickets to Super Bowl XLVI, with Thomas also attending the game.

References

External links

West Virginia Mountaineers football bio
Chicago Bears bio

1988 births
Living people
Players of American football from Fort Lauderdale, Florida
Blanche Ely High School alumni
American football linebackers
West Virginia Mountaineers football players
Chicago Bears players
Jacksonville Jaguars players
New York Giants players